The flag of Victoria, symbolising the state of Victoria in Australia, is a British Blue Ensign defaced by the state badge of Victoria in the fly.  The badge is the Southern Cross surmounted by an imperial crown, which is currently the St Edward's Crown.  The stars of the Southern Cross are white and range from five to eight points with each star having one point pointing to the top of the flag. The flag dates from 1870, with minor variations, the last of which was in 1953. It is the only Australian state flag not to feature the state badge on a round disc.

History

1844 separation flag
In 1844, John Harrison, the father of H. C. A. Harrison, designed a flag for the Separation Society, an organisation advocating for the separation of the Port Phillip District (present-day Victoria) from the Colony of New South Wales. The flag, featuring "a white star centred on a crimson ground", was flown at a large open-air meeting on Batman's Hill in June 1844. It was described more fully in the Port Phillip Gazette:
The flag will in size be about seven feet by five, of a deep crimson ground, with a white five pointed star in the middle; on one side the device is a sheep suspended with the words "Squatters, guard your rights," as an inscription, on the counter side are two pillars to represent commerce and agriculture based on the blocks of honor and truth; suspended over and midway between the columns, is a crown supported by a ribbon upon which the word "loyalty" is inscribed; a pair of sheep shears bearing the word "tyranny," cross the ribbon above the crown. The union is pictured in the form of clasped hands between the two pillars, under which is the motto "Keep yourselves and God will keep you." On the point of the pole will he formed gilded kangaroo.
Harrison flew the flag again in 1851 at a meeting of miners on the goldfields at Bendigo.

Previous official flags

The first flag of Victoria was adopted in 1870 and was first flown from HMVS Nelson on 9 February 1870.  It too was a defaced British Blue Ensign with the Southern Cross located in the fly.  The stars of the Southern Cross were white and had 5, 6, 7, 8 and 9 points with only the leftmost and rightmost stars having one point pointing to the top of the flag.  The adoption of the flag came about when Victoria became the first Australian colony to acquire a warship, and thus under the British Colonial Naval Defence Act 1865 Victoria needed a flag to distinguish its ships from other British ships. At the same time, the red ensign was incorrectly authorised for use by civil vessels registered in the colony of Victoria. Despite the invalid authorisation, the flag continued to be used, and was flown alongside the Union flag during federation celebrations in 1901. The red ensign did not track changes to the blue ensign, and so no crown was added, nor did the stars rotate to point upwards facing the flag.

Victoria then adopted the current flag in 1877 with the stars of the southern cross from then on having 5, 6, 7, 7 and 8 points. The depictions of the crown have varied in accordance with heraldic fashion and the wishes of the monarch of the time. During Queen Victoria's reign, the crown had slightly dipped arches. From c. 1901–1952, during the reigns of Kings Edward VII, George V, Edward VIII and George VI the depiction of the crown known as the "Tudor Crown", with domed arches, was used. In 1953 the Tudor Crown was replaced with the St Edward's Crown.

Construction 
Unlike the national flag, the flag of Victoria is not enshrined and protected by any acts of state or Commonwealth government. As a result, there are no official legal requirements for the construction of the flag of Victoria. However, tradition and decorum dictate that is should be:

 the Union Jack occupying the upper quarter next the staff;
 the fly is to be wholly blue, in line with the British Blue Ensign;
 the State Badge is to be situated with its centre halfway between the edge of the canton and the end of the fly, and to occupy the majority of thereof;

Gallery

See also 
Coat of arms of Victoria
List of Australian flags
Flags of the Governors of the Australian states

References

External links

 Flags flown by HMVS Cerberus

1870 establishments in Australia
Flags introduced in 1870
Victoria (Australia)
Victoria
Victoria
Southern Cross flags
Society in Victoria (Australia)